Susan Lewellyn Pamerleau (born July 29, 1946) is a retired United States Air Force major general who served from January 1, 2013, to December 31, 2016, as the Republican sheriff of Bexar County, Texas. She is the United States Marshal for the Western District of Texas.

Personal life 
Pamerleau is the daughter of Disciples of Christ minister Dr. Truce V. Lewellyn (of Walnut Cove, North Carolina) and the late Mary Nelle [nee Montgomery] Lewellyn (of Knoxville, Tennessee).   Pamerleau received a BA degree in sociology from the University of Wyoming at Laramie in 1968 and an M.P.A. from Golden Gate University in 1977.

In 1978, after first seeking marriage counseling help, Pamerleau left her abusive husband, Ben, after a marriage of seven years. Following the separation, Ben took his own life. During her 2012 campaign, Pamerleau cited her experience as a survivor of family violence as part of what prepared her to serve as sheriff.  In addition, her focus on mental illness in the criminal justice system was personal, as she has a brother who suffered from mental illness.

Career

United States Air Force 
Pamerleau served in the United States Air Force for 32 years, being promoted to brigadier general in 1994 and to major general in 1997. Her first assignment as a general officer in the United States Air Force was as commandant of the Air Force Reserve Officer Training Corps.  Her next assignment was as the Commander of the Air Force Personnel Center, followed by her last assignment at Headquarters Air Force in The Pentagon as the director, Personnel Force Programs.

Assignments 
 September 1968 – July 1970, administration and personnel officer, 1928th Communications Group, MacDill Air Force Base, Fla.
 August 1970 – July 1971, Women in the Air Force coordinator, Detachment 204, 3502nd Recruiting Group, Richmond, Va.
 August 1971 – April 1973, administrative management officer, 31st Field Maintenance Squadron, Homestead Air Force Base, Fla.
 April 1973 – April 1974, executive support officer, 3rd Civil Engineering Squadron, Kunsan Air Base, South Korea
 April 1974 – September 1978, commander, Women in the Air Force Squadron, later chief, central base administration, 56th Tactical Fighter Wing, MacDill Air Force Base, Fla.
 September 1978 – November 1979, chief, central base administration, 435th Tactical Airlift Wing, Rhein-Main Air Base, West Germany
 November 1979 – August 1984, staff officer, Deputy Directorate for Bases and Units, Directorate of Programs, Deputy Chief of Staff for Programs and Resources, Headquarters U.S. Air Force, Washington, D.C.
 August 1984 – June 1985, student, Industrial College of the Armed Forces, Fort Lesley J. McNair, Washington, D.C.
 June 1985 – March 1987, chief, Force Programs Division, Directorate of Plans, Programs and Analysis, Air Force Military Personnel Center, Randolph Air Force Base, Texas
 March 1987 – August 1988, commander, 3700th Personnel Resources Group, Air Force Military Training Center, Lackland Air Force Base, Texas
 August 1988 – April 1989, vice wing commander, Air Force Basic Military Training School, Lackland Air Force Base, Texas
 April 1989 – July 1992, executive officer, Plans and Policy Division, International Military Staff, NATO Headquarters, Brussels, Belgium
 July 1992 – March 1993, chief, Resource Allocation Division and Personnel and Support Team, Directorate of Personnel Programs, Deputy Chief of Staff, Personnel, Headquarters U.S. Air Force, the Pentagon, Washington, D.C.
 March 1993 – July 1994, vice commander, Air Force Military Personnel Center, Randolph Air Force Base, Texas
 August 1994 – February 1996, commandant, Headquarters Air Force Reserve Officer Training Corps, Maxwell Air Force Base, Ala.
 February 1996 – May 1998, commander, Air Force Personnel Center, Randolph Air Force Base, Texas
 May 1998 – 2000, director of personnel force management, Deputy Chief of Staff for Personnel, Headquarters U.S. Air Force, the Pentagon, Washington, D.C.

Effective dates of promotion 
 Second Lieutenant September 24, 1968
 First Lieutenant March 24, 1970
 Captain September 24, 1971
 Major May 1, 1980
 Lieutenant Colonel March 1, 1984
 Colonel July 1, 1989
 Brigadier General August 1, 1994
 Major General August 1, 1997

USAA 
After retiring from the Air Force in September 2000, Pamerleau worked at USAA, first as vice president of Membership Development; and later as senior vice president of Specialized Operations & International.

Bexar County Sheriff's Office
In 2012 Pamerleau was elected the first woman sheriff in the history of Bexar County, Texas. Citing technology and policy issues that were "30 years behind", Pamerleau conducted a top-to-bottom review of the sheriff's office and began implementing policies to modernize the office. Improvements included digital record keeping, stab-vests for detention officers, and improved communications within the jail.

Mental health advocate and journalist, Pete Earley, has said of Bexar County's jail diversion programs "I’ve been to 48 states, five foreign countries, and I’ve testified five times before Congress, and Bexar County is known as the gold standard. [Bexar County is the] leading county in America when it comes to jail diversion and stopping the inappropriate incarceration of people who have serious illness like schizophrenia and bipolar disorder."

In the spring of 2016, the Bexar County Deputy Sheriff's Association Union called for a vote of no confidence in Pamerleau.  Of the 1,600 deputies in the department, 219 voted no confidence.  That summer, Pamerleau faced inquiries about four suicides in the Bexar County Jail that occurred from June 28 to July 22, 2017.

2016 election 
In the November 8, 2016, general election, Pamerleau narrowly lost to Democrat Javier Salazar, a San Antonio police officer who had never previously sought elected office.  Salazar received 278,102 votes (50.4 percent) to Pamerleau's 273,914 (49.6 percent).  In defeat, Pamerleau polled more votes in 2016 than she had in victory in 2012.

Shortly before Pamerleau left office, Salazar obtained a temporary restraining order from Judge John D. Gabriel which forbade Pamerleau from making personnel changes in the final days of her administration.  Another judge, Gloria Saldana, dissolved the court order in the final hours of Pamerleau's tenure of office.

United States Marshal
U.S. President Donald Trump nominated Pamerleau to be the United States Marshal for the Western District of Texas, one of the busiest in the country, which includes the cities of San Antonio, Midland/Odessa, El Paso, Austin, and Waco.  The Senate confirmed her by voice vote on August 28, 2018.  Pamerleau is the first female marshal to head the 173-year-old federal court district.

Medals and decorations
Major General Pamerleau has been awarded the following awards and decorations:

References

1945 births
Living people
Golden Gate University alumni
Military personnel from Tennessee
People from Knoxville, Tennessee
Recipients of the Air Force Distinguished Service Medal
Recipients of the Legion of Merit
Texas Republicans
Texas sheriffs
United States Air Force generals
United States Marshals
University of Wyoming alumni
Women in the United States Air Force
Women sheriffs
Military personnel from San Antonio